The Speaker of the Louisiana House of Representatives is the presiding officer of the Louisiana House of Representatives, the lower house of the Louisiana State Legislature. The speaker serves as the leader and head of the Louisiana House. The speaker is traditionally suggested by the Governor of Louisiana. The speaker's counterpart in the State Senate is the President of the Senate, currently Republican Patrick Page Cortez.

History 
The first speaker, Pierre Bauchet St. Martin, was elected by the House in 1812. During the first years of statehood the speakership and the Louisiana House of Representative was dominated by supporters of Henry Clay, after 1845 the Democratic Party came to dominate politics until the United States Civil War. After the war the state, along with the rest of the southern states, underwent the Reconstruction from 1865 until 1877, during this time politics were dominated by the Republican Party. In 1877 the Democrats came to power again and stayed in power in the House until late 2010. During this time the practice of the Governor appointing the speaker began. In 2008 Republican Governor Bobby Jindal appointed the first Republican speaker in over a hundred years even though the Democrats held a small majority.

Powers 
The speaker serves as the presiding officer and highest ranking representative in the Louisiana House of Representatives. He rules on points of order during sessions, makes committee assignments, which are usually actually made by the Governor. The speaker is usually an ally of the Governor and serves as his floor leader in the House, in this role he plays a vital part in passing legislation. The speaker usually is a chief negotiator in getting legislation passed on behalf of the Governor. The speaker leads the coalition of the Governor's supporters in the House, serves as the leader of House of Representatives, he controls the flow of legislation through the House, and serves as an ex officio member of each House committee. The speaker is sixth in the gubernatorial line of succession.

List of speakers

Speaker pro tempore
The speaker pro tempore is appointed in the same way as the speaker. The Speaker pro tempore acts as speaker in the absence of the speaker. If the chair is ever permanently vacated the speaker pro tempore acts as the temporary  presiding officer until the House elects a new speaker. The Speaker pro tempore, although not officially a powerful position, generally serves as a major power player in the House. The House of Representatives created the position in 1972.

List of speakers pro tempore

See also

Governor of Louisiana
President of the Louisiana State Senate
 List of Louisiana state legislatures

References

External links 
http://house.legis.state.la.us/

 
Louisiana State Legislature
Speakers
Louisiana